Suffolk County Transit is the provider of bus services in Suffolk County, New York on Long Island and is an agency of the Suffolk County government. It was founded in 1980 as a county-run oversight and funding agency for a group of private contract operators which had previously provided such services on their own. While the physical maintenance and operation of the buses continue to be provided by these providers, other matters ranging from bus purchases to route and schedule planning to fare rules are set by Suffolk Transit itself.

Though serving the entirety of Suffolk County, the one exception is in Huntington, located in the northwestern part of the county, where that town's private operator declined to join Suffolk Transit. Instead, Huntington took over that town's system which became Huntington Area Rapid Transit, or HART. Most of HART's routes do connect to both Suffolk Transit and Nassau Inter-County Express and one can transfer between HART and Suffolk Transit fairly easily. In addition, the village of Patchogue has its own local bus service.

History
Suffolk County Transit began as the consolidation of numerous private bus companies, many of which became contractors for the county. These included the Bornscheuer Bus Company which served Amityville, Copiague, Lindenhurst, West Babylon, and Babylon. Affiliated company EBT, Inc (an affiliate of School Bus Company Educational Bus Transportation, Incorporated), continues in existence under contract with Suffolk County Transit.

In Central Suffolk, the East Patchogue-based Louis A. Fuoco Bus Line (1962-1992) served Patchogue, East Patchogue, Hagerman, Bellport, South Haven, Mastic, Mastic Beach, Port Jefferson, Medford, Coram, Ridge, Calverton, and Riverhead. Continued to exist during early years of Suffolk County Transit. Also, Coram Bus Service (1958-1992) primarily operated school buses, but also began serving mass transit routes in the Town of Brookhaven towards locations as far west as Commack and East Northport, and as far east as Riverhead.

On the North Shore, Huntington Coach Corporation (1927–present) served Huntington, Farmingdale, Melville, and Halesite. Quinn's Bus Lines, and later Coram Bus Service after the two were merged in 1969, mainly served the area between Port Jefferson and Wading River; especially after the demise of the Wading River Extension of the Port Jefferson Branch.

In the western Town of Islip, Suffolk Bus Corporation (1946–present), which served Bay Shore, Brentwood, West Brentwood, Central Islip, Islip, and Babylon, continues in existence under contract with Suffolk County Transit.

On the east end, Sunrise Coach Lines (1946–Present), which served Greenport, Riverhead, Southampton, Sag Harbor, and Easthampton, began operations in 1946, continued in existence under contract with joint venture Twin Forks Transit for the routes they originally operated for Suffolk County Transit. In 2006 Sunrise Coaches EXPRESS Routes were bought by Hampton Jitney.

Utility Lines, a Bee Line Incorporated subsidiary, ran from Patchogue along Montauk Highway into Merrick Road in Nassau County. This line was merged into the Metropolitan Suburban Bus Authority in 1973, but funding and service disputes lead to the splitting of that route between the N19 west of Babylon and S40 east of  Babylon.

Inter-County Motor Coach Incorporated, which is still based in the Village of Babylon has been operating since 1922. Affiliated companies included Babylon Transit operating from 1937 until around 1986, and Lindenhurst Bus Company, which operated from 1952 to 1986, both companies running in their final years under contract with Suffolk County Transit.
 
Alert Coach, an affiliate of Baumann & Sons Buses, Incorporated, and Acme Bus Corporation began on November 30, 1966, and had at least four lines within the county, which included a troubled history with the Suffolk portion of the old Utility Lines bus.

During his tenure as Suffolk County executive, Steve Levy proposed a takeover of Suffolk County Transit by the MTA.

In 2011 the Suffolk County Legislature authorized a fare hike from $1.50 to $2.00 on the S92 and 10C routes only. In return, service on those two routes was expanded to Sunday during the summer months. The fare hike took place on June 17, 2011, with Sunday service operating from July until September.

Fare
The current Suffolk County Transit base fare for most one-way local bus travel is $2.25. For seniors, veterans and the disabled, the base fare is $0.75; personal care attendants (PCA) may ride for free when traveling with seniors or the disabled. Students with school-issued identification pay a reduced fare of $1.25. Undergraduate students of Stony Brook University (which prepays for the rides at the start of the school year so that it does not have to run its own buses) may ride to Smith Haven Mall on the S60 and 3D for free, with a valid SBU ID, on Saturdays. Children under five years of age are free, with a limit of three children for every paying adult.

Fare payment is conducted with the traditional non-digital use of Suffolk Transit bus tokens, coins or paper currency, and must be exact. There is no magnetic reader technology in use, such as NYC or Nassau County's MetroCard, in use. Bus transfers cost an additional $0.25, and must be requested and paid for upon boarding the bus.  These transfers are valid for two hours after issue and can be used on Suffolk County Transit connecting routes, or to Nassau Inter-County Express (NICE) connecting routes with a special transfer request slip (transfers to NICE require payment of a "step-up" fare). You can use transfers from MTA NYC Bus, NICE Bus, HART, other Long Island/NYC area bus companies. Metro Cards are also allowed with dispatch notice.

Bus service hours
Suffolk Transit bus service operates 7 days a week. Many routes run Monday to Friday from 6:00 am to 7:00 pm, with the exceptions of the S69, which runs until 10:20 pm, the S54 and S92, run until 10:15 pm, S1, until 10:05 pm and S45, which finishes at 10:00 pm. On weekdays, the S27 and S40, have evening service that runs their last route until around 9:00pm or so. The S47 runs June through September, 7 days a week. Many longer bus routes such as the S58 eastbound, connecting East Northport with Riverhead, run shortened routes after 4:50 pm, terminating in Middle Island, rather than Riverhead. Similarly, on Saturdays, the S62, normally connecting Hauppauge with Riverhead, only runs between the Smith Haven Mall in Lake Grove and Riverhead, leaving no connection with Hauppauge on Long Island's north shore.

Saturday bus service, for most routes, runs from 8:00 am to 7:00 pm.

On Sundays, only the S1, S33, S40, S41, S45, S54, S58, S61, S66, S92, 3D, and 10C run, using the Saturday schedule for service times.

With the exception of the S47, S92, and 10C, there is no service on New Year's Day, Memorial Day, Independence Day, Labor Day, Thanksgiving Day or Christmas Day.

Routes

Main routes are prefixed with a "S" to signify "Suffolk County" to fall in line with other nomenclature used by the MTA and other bus companies in the region. Nonetheless, the agency has no ties to the MTA, and in fact the "S" prefix is already  used for Staten Island routes. Feeder routes do not have the "S" prefix, however they have various letter suffixes.

Bus route assignments
Rather than operate its services in-house like most transit agencies, Suffolk County Transit contracts all their routes to private contractors. The table below lists the private contractors hired to provide fixed-route services.  It does not include Suffolk County Accessible Transportation paratransit service, which is solely operated by Suffolk Bus Corporation.

Note:  EBT INC is the operator of Suffolk County Transit Buses, EBT INC is the sister company of Educational Bus Transportation (a school bus company).

Note: Twin Forks Transit is a joint venture of Hampton Jitney and Sunrise Coach Lines.

Suffolk County Accessible Transportation
Suffolk County Accessible Transportation (SCAT) is Suffolk Transit's federally mandated paratransit service for ADA-eligible passengers with disabilities. SCAT service is available Monday through Saturday, 6:00 AM to 8:30 PM and Sunday 7:00 PM to 8:30 PM. The fare for an ADA eligible rider is $4.00. When that rider is accompanied by a personal care attendant (PCA), that PCA does not pay a fare, but must have the same origin and destination as the rider. If riders choose to travel with companions not a PCA, that person must pay the fare of $4.00.

Fleet

Current bus fleet

Retired fleet
All retired buses prior to 1981 were brought either secondhand by Suffolk County or the bus companies that operated for the county or brought by the operators and then by Suffolk County when they took over bus operations in 1980–1981. Some buses were renumbered after entering service; all fleet numbers listed are the numbers the buses were when they entered service.

See also
Long Island Rail Road
Nassau Inter-County Express
Huntington Area Rapid Transit

References

External links
Suffolk County Transit official site
HART Bus official site
Patchogue Village Bus official site
Nassau/Suffolk Transit Map (unofficial)
Suffolk Transit History (unofficial)
Nassau and Suffolk County Bus Companies (ChicagoRailfan) 
Suffolk County Transit Operators

Surface transportation in Greater New York
Bus transportation in New York (state)
Transportation in Suffolk County, New York
1980 introductions